Metajapyx besucheti is a species of forcepstail in the family Japygidae.

Subspecies
These two subspecies belong to the species Metajapyx besucheti:
 Metajapyx besucheti besucheti Pages, 1978
 Metajapyx besucheti venetus Pages, 1993

References

Diplura
Articles created by Qbugbot
Animals described in 1978